Orthonairovirus is a genus  of viruses in the family Nairoviridae of the order Bunyavirales that include viruses with circular, negative-sense single stranded RNA.  It got its name from the Nairobi sheep disease that affects the gastrointestinal tracts of sheep and goats.  The vast majority, and perhaps all viruses in this genus are tick-borne viruses that can have human or other vertebrate hosts.

Structure 
The virions for viruses in this genus have a spherical shape.  They range in size from about 80–120 nm in diameter, with 50% of their weight attributed to proteins and 20–30% of their weight attributed to lipids.  The ribonucleocapsid is filamentous,  having a length of about 200-300 nm and a width of about 2–2.5 nm.
These nucleocapsids are surrounded by a single envelope that has projections made of glycoproteins protruding from its surface.  These projections evenly cover the surface of the virion, and are about 5–10 nm long. They aid in attachment to the host receptor in replication.

Genome 

Nairovirus genomes are negative sense, single-stranded RNA. The complete genome is about 17,100–22,800 nucleotides long, and is divided into three segments: large, medium, and small. The large segment is about 11000–14400 nucleotides long (11–14.4 kb), and it encodes the viral polymerase. The medium segment is about 4,400–6,300 nucleotides long (4.4–6.3 kb), and it encodes for glycoproteins G¬n and Gc. The small segment is about 1,700–2,100 nucleotides long (1.7–2.1 kb), and it encodes the nucleocapsid protein.<

The genome has terminally redundant sequences, with the sequences being repeated at both ends.  The terminal nucleotides are base-paired forming, non-covalently closed, circular RNA.  Both the 5’ and 3’ ends have conserved regions, 9 nucleotides in length.  The sequences are, 5’end: UCUCAAAGA, and 3’end: AGAGUUUCU.

Replication 

Nairoviruses attach to the host receptor by their Gn-Gc glycoprotein dimer.  The virus is then endocytosed into the host cell via a vesicle.  The ribonucleocapsid segments are released into the cytoplasm, commencing transcription. Transcription and replication occur within the cell, and the newly synthesized virions are released by budding.

Transmission and distribution 
Members of this viral genus infect many different vertebrate hosts, and are transmitted via ticks.

Members of the genus Nairovirus may be found the world over, wherever their arthropod vectors and vertebrate hosts are found together.

Clinical importance 
Only four viruses in this genus have, to date, been recognised as human pathogens:

 Crimean-Congo hemorrhagic fever virus
 Dugbe virus
 Nairobi sheep disease virus
 Kasokero virus

A fifth— Erve virus —may also be pathogenic for humans.

Evolution
Phylogenetic analysis has shown that these viruses fall into two major monophyletic groups, the hard (Ixodidae) and soft (Argasidae) tick-vectored groups. This suggests that the Nairoviruses have been associated with these ticks for over 100 million years.

Additionally, nairoviruses vectored by ticks of the genera  Argas, Carios and Ornithodoros form three separate monophyletic lineages, again supporting the suggestion of host-virus cospeciation.

The hard bodied tick serogroups are

 Crimean-Congo hemorrhagic fever
 Nairobi sheep disease
 Sakhalin
 Tamdy

The soft bodied tick serogroups are

 Hughes
 Dera Ghazi Khan
 Qalyub

The tick vectors for the Kasokero and Thiafora serogroups are not currently known.

Taxonomy
The genus includes 41 species:

Abu Hammad orthonairovirus
Abu Mina orthonairovirus
Artashat orthonairovirus
Avalon orthonairovirus
Bandia orthonairovirus
Burana orthonairovirus
Chim orthonairovirus
Congoid orthonairovirus
Crimean-Congo hemorrhagic fever orthonairovirus
Dera Ghazi Khan orthonairovirus
Dugbe orthonairovirus
Erve orthonairovirus
Estero Real orthonairovirus
Gossas orthonairovirus
Hazara orthonairovirus
Huangpi orthonairovirus
Hughes orthonairovirus
Issyk-kul orthonairovirus
Kasokero orthonairovirus
Keterah orthonairovirus
Kupe orthonairovirus
Leopards Hill orthonairovirus
Meram orthonairovirus
Nairobi sheep disease orthonairovirus
Pacific Coast orthonairovirus
Punta orthonairovirus
Qalyub orthonairovirus
Sakhalin orthonairovirus
Sapphire orthonairovirus
Scot orthonairovirus
Soldado orthonairovirus
Tacheng orthonairovirus
Taggert orthonairovirus
Tamdy orthonairovirus
Thiafora orthonairovirus
Tofla orthonairovirus
Tunis orthonairovirus
Vinegar Hill orthonairovirus
Wenzhou orthonairovirus
Yogue orthonairovirus
Zirqa orthonairovirus

See also
 Farallon virus
 Meihua Mountain orthonairovirus
 Puffin Island virus
 Yezo orthonairovirus

References

External links
 ICTV Report: Nairoviridae
 Viralzone: Nairovirus

Nairoviridae
Virus genera